The Brill Dictionary of Ancient Greek is an English language dictionary of Ancient Greek, translated, with the addition of some entries and improvements, from the third Italian edition of Franco Montanari's GI - Vocabolario della lingua greca. 
It's mostly a new lexicographical work, not directly based on any previous dictionary. It has about 140,000 entries over 2500 pages.

The Italian third edition has been published in 2013 (first edition in 1995), a Modern Greek translation has been published in 2013, and the English edition has been published by Brill in 2015, edited by Madeleine Goh and Chad Schroeder, and a German translation is to be published in July 2023 by De Gruyter. There is also an online version, which can also be subscribed by universities and other institutions.

References

Bibliography
 Panagiotis Filos (2018) The Brill Dictionary of Ancient Greek (review) in Bryn Mawr Classical Review
 Franco Montanari 2015 video interview, with English subtitles, about the English edition

External links
 Official page of the English print edition.
 Words in Progress project, Supplementary Lexicon of Ancient Greek, Directed by Franco Montanari, Serena Perrone

Ancient Greek dictionaries
1995 non-fiction books